Dongfeng District is a district of the city of Jiamusi, Heilongjiang province, People's Republic of China.

Administrative divisions 
Dongfeng District is divided into 5 subdistricts, 1 town and 1 township. 
5 subdistricts
 Xiaoyun, Jiadong, Zaozhi, Jianan, Jianguo,
1 town
 Jianguo
1 township
 Songjiang

Notes and references

External links
  Government site - 

Dongfeng